Jennifer Fisher may refer to:

Jennifer Fisher (art historian), American contemporary art academic
Jennifer Fisher (designer), American jewelry designer
Jennifer Fisher (athlete) (born 1959), Bermudian runner and competitor at the 1987 World Championships